Swansea Town may refer to:

Swansea City A.F.C.
A popular song by Max Boyce